Department for Children, Schools and Families (DCSF) was a department of the UK government, between 2007 and 2010, responsible for issues affecting people in England up to the age of 19, including child protection and education. DCSF was replaced by the Department for Education after the change of government following the 2010 General Election.

The department was led by the Secretary of State for Children, Schools and Families.

The expenditure, administration and policy of the department was scrutinised by the Children, Schools and Families Select Committee.

History and responsibilities
DCSF was created on 28 June 2007 following the demerger of the Department for Education and Skills (DfES). The department was led by Ed Balls. The Permanent Secretary was David Bell.

Other education functions of the former DCSF were taken over by the Department for Business, Innovation and Skills (originally the Department for Innovation, Universities and Skills, since merged with Department for Business, Enterprise and Regulatory Reform).

DCSF was directly responsible for state schools in England. The Minister of State for Schools and Learning was the minister in charge.

The Department employed over 2,500 staff.

Locations
In May 2010, DCSF had four main sites:
 Castle View House, Runcorn
 Moorfoot Building, Sheffield
 Mowden Hall, Darlington
 Sanctuary Buildings, London

Criticisms

Brain gym
Charlie Brooker, writing in The Guardian, expressed incredulity that the department was supportive of Brain Gym, despite its broad condemnation by scientific organisations, and despite it being apparently nonsense.

Upon learning that the programme was used at hundreds of UK state schools, Dr Ben Goldacre of The Guardian's Bad Science pages called it a "vast empire of pseudoscience" and went on to dissect parts of their teaching materials, refuting, for instance, claims that rubbing the chest would stimulate the carotid arteries, that "processed foods do not contain water", or that liquids other than water "are processed in the body as food, and do not serve the body's water needs."

Child friendly identity and branding

The department adopted a "child friendly" visual identity, known as "Building the Rainbow" shortly after it was established. The main features of the brand identity were a rainbow logo and images of cartoonised children carrying blocks to build the rainbow logo. The lettering on the logo was all in lower case despite being a proper noun. It was reported in The Daily Telegraph that several thousand pounds were spent on adopting and implementing this visual identity. The Conservatives, then in opposition, nicknamed the department the "Department for Curtains and Soft Furnishings", a nickname often used by the media.

Refurbishment of headquarters building
The Department also came under criticism during the 2010 General Election, after it was revealed that the Department's offices had a refit which included a "contemplation room". Other features include a grand glass and steel staircase and imported Italian designer furniture. The total cost of the refit was estimated to be three million pounds, at a time when the department needed to make two billion pounds of savings.

See also
 Department for Education and Skills (Wales) - Welsh equivalent
 Education Directorates - Scottish equivalent
 Department of Education (Northern Ireland) - Northern Irish equivalent

References

External links
 Department for Children, Schools and Families Archived Website
 Hansard
 Digital Education Resource Archive (DERA) contains more than 850 digital publications produced by the DCSF.

 
Children, Schools and Families
Government agencies established in 2007
Government agencies disestablished in 2010
2007 establishments in the United Kingdom
2010 disestablishments in the United Kingdom